"Cheshire" is a song recorded by South Korean girl group Itzy for their sixth extended play of the same name. It was released as the EP's lead single by JYP Entertainment and Republic Records on November 30, 2022.

Background and release
On November 7, 2022, JYP Entertainment announced Itzy would be releasing their sixth extended play titled Cheshire on November 30, with the promotional schedule released on the same day. On November 24, the track listing was released with "Cheshire" announced as the lead single. The following day, the track spoiler video was released. The music video teasers was released on November 28 and 29. The song was released alongside its music video and the EP on November 30.

Composition
"Cheshire" was written by Hwang Su-min and Jeong Ha-ri of 153/Joombas, composed and arranged primarily by Timothy Tan and Justin Reinstein along with Ciara Muscat, Josefin Glenmark, Jar (153/Joombas), and Jjean for the composition. It was described as a dance-pop song featuring "fresh piano riff and strong bass rhythm" with lyrics that conveys the message of "believing in your own feelings as there is no right answer to your worries and questions about yourself". "Cheshire" was composed in the key of G major, with a tempo of 99 beats per minute.

Commercial performance
"Cheshire" debuted at number 105 on South Korea's Circle Digital Chart in the chart issue dated November 27 – December 3, 2022; on its component charts, it debuted at number 12 on the Circle Download Chart, number 181 on the Circle Streaming Chart, and number 54 on the Circle BGM Chart. It ascended to number 89 on the Circle Digital Chart, number 110 on the Circle Streaming Chart in the following week. In Singapore, the song debuted number 24 on the RIAS Top Streaming Chart, and number 12 on the RIAS Top Regional Chart in the chart issue dated December 2–8, 2022. In Taiwan, the song debuted at number 16 on the Billboard Taiwan Songs in the chart issue dated December 17, 2022. In Netherlands, the song debuted at number 31 on the Dutch Global 40 in the chart issue dated December 5, 2022.

Promotion
Following the release of Cheshire, on November 30, 2022, the group performed "Cheshire" at 2022 MAMA Awards. They subsequently performed on three music programs in the first week: KBS's Music Bank on December 2, MBC's Show! Music Core on December 3, and SBS's Inkigayo on December 4. On the second week, they performed on Music Bank on December 9 where they won first place, Show! Music Core on December 10, and Inkigayo on December 11.

Accolades

Credits and personnel
Credits adapted from Melon.

Studio
 JYPE Studio – recording, mixing, digital editing
 Sterling Sound – mastering
 Studio Nomad – digital editing

Personnel

 Itzy – vocals
 Song Hee-jin (Solcire) – background vocals
 Hwang Su-min (153/Joombas) – lyrics
 Jeong Ha-ri (153/Joombas) – lyrics
 Timothy Tan – composition, arrangement, synth, bass, piano/keys, drum
 Justin Reinstein – composition, arrangement, synth
 Ciara Muscat – composition
 Josefin Glenmark – composition
 Jar (153/Joombas) – composition
 Jjean – compositio
 Goo Hye-jin – recording, digital editing
 Lee Tae-seop – mixing
 Chris Gehringer – mastering
 Kwon Nam-woo – mastering
 Choi – digital editing
 Mr Cho (Solcire) – digital editing
 Noday – vocal directing

Charts

Weekly charts

Monthly charts

Release history

See also
 List of Music Bank Chart winners (2022)

References

Itzy songs
2022 singles
2022 songs
Korean-language songs
JYP Entertainment singles
Republic Records singles